Somma Vesuviana is a town and comune in the Metropolitan City of Naples, Campania, southern Italy.

History

Before the Roman colonisation, the area of today's Somma Vesuviana was probably inhabited by Italic peoples like Samnites and Oscans.

Later it became a resort for rich patricians of Rome or for rich estate owners who built magnificent villas in the area.

Excavations have shown that this north side of the Vesuvius volcano was equally as populated as the southern side where Pompeii and Herculaneum lie, but has not been paid as much attention by historians. The area was buried during the eruption of Vesuvius of 472 AD and not 79 AD (like that which buried Pompeii etc.), and so was part of the community that continued after the earlier eruption and recovered better than the territories to the south.

Excavations

A large Roman villa was discovered in the 1930s in the frazione of Starza della Regina, and interpreted as that of emperor Augustus at Nola where he probably passed his last days of life.

Baths of a Roman villa were also discovered in nearby Pollena Trocchia in 1988 and subsequently exposed.

Among the vestiges at Somma then discovered was a majestic colonnade with arches oriented 12 m long, connected to wall decorated with three niches. Marble columns and capitals, mosaic floors, splendid fragments of statues depicting people with sumptuous robes, polychrome frescoes and coffered ceilings were discovered.

In 2002 excavations on the villa started again. Part of the villa has been brought to light with its rich decoration.

The part then excavated includes a monumental entrance of a vast Roman villa dating from the mid-2nd century AD, used as audience halls for visitors. They had  apses that were richly decorated with frescoes. Another room was paved with marble slabs and a mosaic, but later was divided into two parts for food storage and a stable.

More recent excavations in 2015 have revealed a massive water cistern for irrigation of farmland from the 4th century.

Main sights
Characteristic are the historic center and the surrounding area which retain the appearance of the past.

The city also has an archaeological site of interest.  According to Strabone, a Roman historian of the 2nd century, the city was founded by the same group of Osci who founded Herculaneum and who called the city Sommax.  Julius Andronicus reports in his Acutum Fondationum that the city was founded by a group of plebeians led by Tiberius Gracchus who called the city "Saxo Tribunum" (city of the plebeians).  Marenzio, historian of 77 AD.  describes the foundation with the Samnites.  The discovery took place in 1997, when the amateur archaeologist Nicola Sannuto discovered the archaeological site that corresponded with Saxo Tribunum.

The village of Casamale

The village that takes its name from the aristocratic Causamala family, which appears for the first time in a lease deed of 1011. The ancient Aragonese walls surround the village, consolidated in 1467 by King Ferrante of Aragon.  These walls were used to contain the embankments around the "Terra Murata".  Four gates opened along the walls: Porta Terra (or Porta San Pietro) located on the north side;  Porta Formosi (or Porta Marina) located on the west side;  porta della Montagna (or porta Castello) located on the south side;  Porta Piccioli (or Porta All Saints) located on the east side.

The central nucleus of the Casamale is an ecclesiastical building, the convent of the Hermit Fathers of Sant'Agostino with the chapel first dedicated to San Giacomo and then, after the construction of the church, to Santa Maria della Sanità.  In 1595 the church was awarded the title of Collegiate changing the name of Santa Maria Maggiore.  The Casamale enclosed within its walls, in addition to the imposing Collegiata, convents and palaces of the aristocracy which only partially occupied the insulae.  These lands were gradually occupied and inhabited by settlers, traders and artisans.  The ancient medieval village of Casamale is still intact, despite the evident traces of tampering consisting of concrete interventions between the ancient stone walls.

The village develops on the ridge of Monte Somma, between 180 and 220 m a.s.l.  and consists of a space delimited by ancient walls, still clearly visible today, which identify a clear border with the rest of the town.  The village is cleverly protected to the south by Mount Somma, to the east by the Fosso dei Leoni riverbed and to the west by the Cavone del Purgatorio riverbed.  Around the center, the current Collegiata, a medieval system develops made up of narrow streets, some arches, with the roofs of the houses that seem to touch, not allowing the sun to filter through.  The buildings are gray in color and there are often important piperno entrance arches.  The balconies of the houses, decorated with wrought iron parapets, are slightly protruding and are set on robust thresholds in worked piperno.  Architectural elements of the 16th, 17th and 18th centuries stand next to the medieval buildings, including Palazzo Colletta-Orsini, Palazzo Basadonna, the monastery of the Carmelite Nuns, Palazzo Secondulfo.  This important heritage of art and culture has undergone numerous manipulations which have destroyed in a short time structures that had remained intact for centuries.

Borgo Casamale, linked for years to the traditional and evocative "Festa delle Lucerne", which takes place every 4 years, made up of picturesque views and perspective games, thanks to the presence of the lamps that in the historic center outline with touches of color and intense and warm brightness, corners and glimpses of alleys, highlighting the historical artistic and cultural heritage of Somma Vesuviana.  Passionate craftsmen, exhibiting their work, highlight a past on which to continue building, a past that fascinates and involves citizens and visitors.

The church of San Domenico 
The church of San Domenico rises in the heart of Somma Vesuviana and with the consent of Pope Nicolò IV was built by King Charles II of Anjou in 1294. It was later entrusted to the Preachers of the order of the Dominicans. The Angevin origin of the church is recalled by a canvas, the work of Cacciapuoti and placed behind the altar, depicting Charles II of Anjou kneeling at the feet of the Virgin and San Domenico who sanctifies. The church was dedicated to Santa Maddalena.

The monastic complex established itself as a cultural center and as a venue for important economic-patrimonial transactions and for the management of income from its extensive real estate accumulated through bequests, donations and purchases.  On the floor of the church some tombstones recall the burial of characters who over the centuries gave life to Somma Vesuviana.  The waters of the cistern located in the cloister have quenched the thirst of the local population for centuries.  The cloister was also for a long time the seat of the meetings of the Mayor and of the city parliament, a privilege abolished by the Viceroy of Naples in 1696.

Numerous catastrophic events, including the 1631 eruption, caused collapses and consequent restoration and change interventions.  In the eighteenth century, due to many restorations, the underlying Gothic structures were made illegible.  In 1794 another eruption caused the collapse of some structures and with the subsequent reconstruction the current façade was built against the existing one.  With the second abolition of religious orders (1861-1866), the church and convent were given ownership to the municipality of Somma Vesuviana.  The church was entrusted to a rector appointed from time to time by the municipal council.  Some rooms of the convent were instead used as municipal headquarters and for other public offices, political, cultural, recreational and welfare organizations.  After the 1980 Irpinia earthquake the church was declared unfit for use, and only later were restoration and static rehabilitation works carried out.

The facade of the church today is characterized by a narrow pronaos maintained by two Ionic columns, which is accessed by a staircase in piperno.  The pronaos continues to the second order, with a recessed space enclosed by a balustrade.  Six semi-columns articulate the facade, four of which are a direct extension of the pronaos below.  Above this second order, a circle-shaped window hides the rose window of the ancient Gothic façade.  Above this is the tympanum.  The internal space, with a single nave, is preceded by a vestibule with Corinthian columns on which the monks' choir was located.  The side chapels and the square apse are decorated with exquisitely crafted stuccos.  Canvases by great authors of the 17th and 18th centuries enrich the chapels, while the canvas by Cacciapuoti is placed in the apse. The presence of many seventeenth and eighteenth century tombstones documents the importance and nobility of the church.

Anthropogenic geography

Fractions 
In 2011, the municipality applied for the title of city, which was then obtained in 2012, by decree of the President of the Italian Republic.
Its fractions are the following: Centro Storico Casamale, Crocelle Camaldoli, Fornaro, Lupa, Masseria Allocca, Matarazzo, Mercato Vecchio, Musciabuono, Paradiso, Pizzone Cassante, Reviglione, Rione Trieste, San Sossio, Santa Maria delle Grazie in Castello, Santa Maria del Pozzo, Starza della Regina.

Society
Somma Vesuviana is inhabited by 
33,935 people in 2021.

Foreign residents
Foreign residents in Somma Vesuviana are estimated at 1,179 people, the most numerous foreign minorities are Ukrainians, Sri Lankans, Chinese, Poles, Moroccans and Romanians.

Ukrainians: 428

Romanians: 205

Moroccans: 102

Chinese: 62

Sri Lankans: 42

Poles: 38

Politics

Mayors

Culture and traditions

Traditions of Monte Somma

 Monte Somma

It is tradition every year to go to Mount Somma on the Saturday after Easter and on May 3, to celebrate the festival of the edge, those who participate divide into paranza and scale the mountain.

the Saturday after Easter is known as the Saturday of the fireworks, on this day the paranze go to the sanctuary of the Madonna at the top of Mount Somma Vesuviana, to pay homage to the Madonna with singing hymns.

On the other hand, May 3, also known as Three of the Cross, is the closing day of the festival.  The demonstrations are the same as the Saturday of the fires but the symbolism activated in the circumstances is that of thanksgiving for the abundant harvest.

Palio of Somma Vesuviana

Popular festival held every year in the second week of September on Fridays, Saturdays and Sundays, organized by the "Youth for a United World" group, is an artistic event based on the concept of rediscovering the popular values ​​and traditions of a time of the country starting from the ancient Magister Nundinarum to the charm of ancient crafts, from the consumption of local gastronomic products to the wonderful challenges in the games between the districts;  the proceeds are entirely donated to finance humanitarian projects especially in Africa.

San Gennaro day 

On September 19 of each year the festival dedicated to San Gennaro, patron saint of the city, takes place.

Sport

Football 

In the municipality there is the "Felice Nappi" municipal stadium, where the home matches of the Viribus Unitis football team were played.

The municipality boasts 2 teams:
Viribus Unitis plays in promotion to the sixth level of the Italian championship.
Viribus Unitis 100 militant in the first category seventh level of the Italian championship.

The Felice Nappi stadium is currently out of service due to works and has 2,500 seats.

Cycling 
The sixth stage of the 2023 Giro d'Italia will pass in Somma Vesuviana.

Kitchen 

The typical Campanian products of Somma Vesuviana, Naples, are the yellow Vesuvius tomato (the cultivation, entirely by hand, takes place on support poles that keep the fruit separate from the earth), the Vesuvius apricot, the Monte cherry (or durona del Monte) with a sour aftertaste, Vesuvius plums and Catalan grapes, sweet and with white flesh, a table grape only recently used also for winemaking.

References

Archaeological sites in Campania
Roman villas in Italy